Labor Day is a 2013 American drama film written and directed by Jason Reitman, based on the 2009 novel of the same name by Joyce Maynard. The film stars Kate Winslet and Josh Brolin and was co-produced by Paramount Pictures and Indian Paintbrush, premiering at the Telluride Film Festival on August 29, 2013, and was a Special Presentation at the 2013 Toronto International Film Festival. The film was released in the United States on December 27, 2013.

Plot
In 1987, Adele Wheeler is a depressed single mother who lives in a rural home with her 13-year-old son, Henry. While they are shopping, a man approaches Henry and makes them take him home to look after him. The man is revealed to be Frank Chambers, an escaped convict wanted by police.

Through flashbacks, it is revealed that Frank is a Vietnam War veteran who married his pregnant girlfriend, Mandy Chambers. A year after the baby's birth, they had a fight, in which he asked if he was the father. He pushed her against a radiator, resulting in her death. Simultaneously, through imagery, it is implied that the baby drowned. Frank was put in prison for murder.

Adele tells Frank, seen through flashbacks, that she had a number of miscarriages after Henry, culminating with the full-term stillbirth of a baby girl. This has left Adele with severe anxiety and depression, which Henry's father later explains to Henry as the reasons their marriage failed. 

Henry has tried to be both a son and a husband but he realizes he cannot provide all of the things Adele needs. She is a passionate woman who loves to dance and teaches both Henry and Frank separately to dance. Frank teaches Henry car repairs and other things.  He also teaches Adele and Henry how to play baseball and how to bake a peach pie.

Adele and Frank fall in love and plan to escape to Canada with Henry, packing the car and cleaning out the house. Meanwhile, Henry develops a friendship with an intelligent and rebellious girl his age named Eleanor, and goes to see her one more time before they leave. She manipulates him into thinking Adele and Frank are going to abandon him and he accidentally reveals Frank's past. Adele assures Henry she would never leave him.  

The morning they are going to leave, Henry takes a note to his father's house and leaves it in his mailbox. While he is walking home, a policeman offers to drive him home, and Henry accepts. The policeman is suspicious of the packed car and nearly-empty house, but eventually leaves. Adele goes to the bank to get all the money out of her account, and the bank staff, too, are suspicious.  While Adele is gone, a neighbor comes over and speaks to Frank. She, too, is suspicious of who he may be. 

Henry's father finds the note that Henry left, and calls the house. Before Adele, Frank, and Henry can escape, they hear police sirens approaching.  Frank ties Henry and Adele up before he goes out to surrender, so that they won't be charged with harboring a fugitive.  It is not revealed who called the police to report Frank's presence at the house. Adele wants to plead in Frank's case but is warned by the prosecutor himself that if she does, Henry might be taken away from her. She writes letters to Frank but to protect her he returns them all unopened.

Years later, adult Henry has become the successful owner of a pie shop and is contacted by Frank, who has seen Henry and his shop in a magazine. He tells Henry he will be released soon and asks him  whether or not he should see his mother again. Henry lets Frank know that his mother is still single and lives in the same house. We see Frank appearing to her and they embrace. Adele and Frank in the autumn years of their lives walk in love and Henry takes solace in the fact that he does not need to worry about her being alone.

Cast

Production

Development
In September 2009, it was announced that Reitman was working on a screenplay, based on Joyce Maynard's novel. Talking about the story, Reitman said that "I read it, and I saw the movie in my head. It challenged me in a way that I liked. It was different from everything else I’ve read."  He also admitted that it was completely different from his previous work and said that "[it] deals with a very complex drama. And I may not nail it on this film, it may just be my first step." Reitman wanted to make the film right after his 2009 film Up in the Air, but due to Winslet's scheduling conflicts, he chose to direct Young Adult first.

Casting
Reitman had Kate Winslet and Josh Brolin in mind for the lead roles. In June 2011, it was revealed that Winslet and Brolin had joined the cast of the film. On casting the actors, he said, "I know what actors I want for it. I'll be able to go to them easily" and that "[Winslet] makes those characters beautiful and sexual. I don’t know another actor who does that. I don’t know what I would have done if she’d said no."

In April 2012, it was announced that James Van Der Beek has joined the cast of the film as a Police Officer and Gattlin Griffith as young Henry Wheeler. In June 2012, it was confirmed that Alexie Gilmore, Brighid Fleming, Lucas Hedges and Micah Fowler had joined the cast of the film. Later Tobey Maguire rounded out the cast and joined the film as adult Henry Wheeler.

Pre-production

Production began for the film on June 5, 2012. Reitman and the film's art director Steve Saklad searched a number of houses in Massachusetts as most of the film is set inside the Wheelers' home. According to Reitman, "We searched the entire state of Massachusetts for that house. My location manager has never looked at that many locations looking for one place. For weeks we would just drive down the street, knocking on people’s doors. The house we found was perfect but it was very modern. Steve brought it back to 1987."

Filming
Principal photography for the film began on June 13, 2012, in Massachusetts. The filming locations included Acton, Belchertown, Shelburne Falls, Ashland, Sutton, Mansfield, Maynard, Natick, Medfield, and Medway, Massachusetts. Filming moved to Acton and scenes shot around Piper Road and at a house located in the area. The movie was also filmed at Canobie Lake Park in Salem, New Hampshire. The filming finished on 17 August 2012.

Promotion
The first image of Winslet, Brolin, and Griffith was released on July 23, 2013, along with the announcement of film having its world premiere at 2013 Toronto International Film Festival. After its premiere at TIFF, the official poster for the film was revealed on 20 September 2013. The first official trailer of the film was released on October 31, 2013 followed by a second trailer released in November 2013.

Paramount partnered with the American Pie Council (APC) in promoting the film, and the APC produced materials promoting both the film and National Pie Day (January 23, eight days before the film's general American release).

Music

The soundtrack was composed by Rolfe Kent who previously composed music for Reitman's Thank You for Smoking (2005), Up in the Air (2009) and Young Adult (2011). The album features I'm Going Home from Arlo Guthrie and Here Before from Vashti Bunyan. It also contains guitar pieces by Andrés Segovia and Shin-Ichi Fukuda. Talking about the music, Kent said that "You know it’s simple to compose happy or sad music, but to create something simple yet sophisticated, that calls the listener to be curious and yet uncertain and perhaps a little unnerved, well it called me to forget everything I knew about composition and discover a whole new musical language. It was at once incredibly stressful, and deeply rewarding."

Film Music Magazine's Daniel Schweiger praised the soundtrack as "most impactful insights to the human condition, while completely surprising with its cinematic, and musical authorships." Kaya Savas of Film Music Media gave the album four and a half star out of five and said that "There is beauty, sadness and uneasiness all tackled with a wonderfully calculated approach."

Soundtracks listing

Songs
The soundtrack album features three songs. "Wings" from Birdy and "Take Us Alive" from Other Lives were featured in the trailers of the movie.

Release
The film had a limited release on December 27, 2013, for a one-week awards-qualifying run and had a wide release on January 31, 2014, in the United States.

Home media
The film was released on DVD + Blu-ray in US on April 29, 2014. Bonus features include deleted scenes, a "End of Summer: making-of" Labor Day segment, and commentary featuring Reitman, cinematographer Steelberg, and first assistant director/co-producer Jason Blumenfeld.

Reception

Box office
The film was opened wide along with That Awkward Moment on Super Bowl weekend. It grossed an estimated $5.3 million in its first three days and ranked seventh on its opening weekend, in domestic box office rankings by Rentrak. The film grossed $13.3 million in the U.S. and $6.9 million in the rest of the world, resulting in a worldwide gross of $20.2 million.

Critical response
According to the aggregate review site Rotten Tomatoes, the film holds a 34% approval rating based on 202 reviews, with an average rating of 5.2/10. The website's critical consensus states: "Kate Winslet and Josh Brolin make for an undeniably compelling pair, but they can't quite rescue Labor Day from the pallid melodrama of its exceedingly ill-advised plot." On Metacritic, the film holds an average score of 52 out of 100, based on 43 reviews from mainstream critics, which indicates "mixed or average reviews". Audiences polled by CinemaScore gave the film an average grade of "B-" on an A+ to F scale.

Todd McCarthy of The Hollywood Reporter, in his review said that "the film emits frequent pangs of emotion and tension, which enable it to prevail over threats from the cliches and inevitabilities of the story's format. There is more than one instance when events will cause many viewers' hearts to leap, as they say, into their throats, and the wrap-up is quietly satisfying." Peter Debruge of Variety stated that Labor Day brims with such carefully observed details, all of them a little too elegant to feel entirely genuine, and yet impossible to fault" and that Winslet "communicates Adele's fragility in a matter of a few short scenes." Lou Lumenick in his review for the New York Post, compared the film with Clint Eastwood's A Perfect World. Mark Kermode of the BBC gave the film a positive review and praised Winslet's performance.

Accolades

References

External links

 
 
 
 
 
 

2013 films
2013 drama films
American drama films
Films directed by Jason Reitman
2010s English-language films
Films shot in Massachusetts
Films set in Massachusetts
Paramount Pictures films
Mr. Mudd films
Films set in 1987
Films based on American novels
Films produced by Jason Reitman
Films with screenplays by Jason Reitman
Films scored by Rolfe Kent
Indian Paintbrush (production company) films
2010s American films
English-language drama films